Iran and Sri Lanka  have had official diplomatic relations since 1961.

History
Diplomatic relations between Iran (then known as Pahlavi Iran) and Sri Lanka (then known as Ceylon) began in 1961 via the Ceylonese embassy in Islamabad, which was the closest Ceylon had to a presence on Iranian soil until the opening of the Tehran embassy office in 1990. Tehran set up its Colombo office in 1975.

After Mahmoud Ahmadinejad became President of Iran, Sri Lanka was the first country he visited on his inaugural Asian tour. Mahinda Rajapaksa also made ties with Iran a priority after he ascended to office.

Development
Iran has helped fund a number of development projects in Sri Lanka. In 2010 they agreed to post US$450-500 million for the Uma Oya Multipurpose Development Project, a 90-100 megawatt hydroelectric power plant around the Central Province. Iran has also invested in Sri Lankan Oil refineries and its investments have helped to double Sri Lankan Oil production capacity. Iran has also invested in rural electrification. These projects have made Iran Sri Lanka's largest aid donor.

Military
During the Sri Lankan Civil War the Government of Sri Lanka approached Iran for loans at low interest to afford Sri Lanka purchases of electronic surveillance aircraft and unmanned aerial vehicles after a particularly daring attack on the Sri Lankan Air Force by the Liberation Tigers of Tamil Eelam. Iran agreed covertly to issue the loan and also invited selected Sri Lankan officers to train in Iran for the war. Analysts have termed Iran's aggressive courting of Sri Lanka's military capacity as a geostragetic implication of Iran's "Look east" strategy. For Iran's assistance in the Sri Lankan Civil War, Sri Lankan minister Wimal Weerawansa said that: "Iran has never let us down, even when many other countries in the world refused to back us. The county as a whole is very grateful for this brotherly treatment".

See also 
 Foreign relations of Iran
 Foreign relations of Sri Lanka

References

 
Bilateral relations of Sri Lanka
Sri Lanka